Bolshoye Aksakovo is a rural locality (a selo) in Podlesnensky Selsoviet, Sterlitamaksky District, Bashkortostan, Russia. The population was 163 as of 2010. There are 7 streets.

Geography 
Bolshoye Aksakovo is located 27 km north of Sterlitamak (the district's administrative centre) by road. Vyazovka is the nearest rural locality.

References 

Rural localities in Sterlitamaksky District